Romina Basso (born Gorizia) is an Italian mezzo-soprano with an extensive discography of baroque opera recordings. She is particularly noted for her performances of Vivaldi.

Discography
 Porpora, Nocturnes
 Pergolesi, Adriano in Siria (Pergolesi). Capella Cracoviensis, Jan Tomasz Adamus
 Vivaldi, Atenaide. Modo Antiquo, Federico Maria Sardelli
 Vivaldi, Ercole sul Termodonte. Europa Galante, Fabio Biondi
 Vivaldi, Orlando Furioso. Modo Antiquo, Federico Maria Sardelli
 Vivaldi, L'Oracolo in Messenia. Europa Galante, Fabio Biondi
 Handel, Giulio Cesare in Egitto. Il Complesso Barocco, Alan Curtis (harpsichordist)
 Handel, Giulio Cesare in Egitto. Orchestra of Patras, George Petrou
 Galuppi, Sacred music. Ghislieri Choir & Consort, Giulio Prandi
 Vivaldi, Armida al campo d'Egitto. Concerto Italiano, Rinaldo Alessandrini
 Vivaldi, New Discoveries I. Modo Antiquo, Federico Maria Sardelli
 Handel, Italian Cantatas Vol.5. La Risonanza, Fabio Bonizzoni, Mark Tucker, Ruth Rosique, Roberta Invernizzi, Franziska Gottwald
 Handel, Italian Cantatas Vol.6. La Risonanza, Fabio Bonizzoni, Mark Tucker, Ruth Rosique, Roberta Invernizzi, Franziska Gottwald
 L'Olimpiade (Opera pasticcio). Venice Baroque Orchestra, Markellos Chryssicos

DVD
 Galuppi, L'Olimpiade. Venice Baroque Orchestra, Andrea Marcon
 Mascagni, Zanetto.

References

Living people
People from Gorizia
Italian operatic mezzo-sopranos
Women performers of early music
Year of birth missing (living people)